All's Well That Ends Well is the sixth studio album by Steve Lukather, released  on vinyl and as a jewel case CD on October 11, 2010 by Mascot Records. In Europe a limited edition Digibook was also released, containing a booklet with studio pictures and liner notes from Lukather and producer CJ Vanston, as well as a personal message from Lukather. The album is dedicated to his late mother Kathy.

Track listing
 "Darkness In My World" (Steve Lukather, CJ Vanston) – 6:59
 "On My Way Home" (Steve Lukather, CJ Vanston) – 5:22
 "Can't Look Back" (Steve Lukather, CJ Vanston) – 4:43
 "Don't Say It's Over" (Steve Lukather, CJ Vanston) – 5:39
 "Flash In The Pan" (Steve Lukather, Fee Waybill) – 4:54
 "Watching The World" (Steve Lukather, CJ Vanston) – 4:51
 "You'll Remember" (Steve Lukather, Steve Weingart, Fee Waybill) – 5:15
 "Brody's" (Steve Lukather, Randy Goodrum) – 5:36
 "Tumescent" (Steve Lukather, Steve Weingart, Carlitos Del Puerto, Eric Valentine) – 4:02

Personnel 
 Steve Lukather – all guitars, lead vocals, backing vocals, arrangements 
 Trevor Lukather – "power" guitars (4)
 CJ Vanston – keyboards, atmospheric sounds, backing vocals, arrangements
 Steve Weingart – keyboards
 Carlitos Del Puerto – bass
 Eric Valentine – drums
 Lenny Castro – percussion
 Jake Hays – handclaps and "heys"
 Glenn Berger – saxophone (2)
 Joseph Williams – backing vocals 
 Bernard Fowler – backing vocals (1)
 Tina Lukather – backing vocals (1)
 Jory Steinberg – backing vocals (1, 2, 8)
 Phil Collen – backing vocals (3, 4)
 Fee Waybill – backing vocals (5, 7)

Production 
 Steve Lukather – producer, liner notes 
 Steve MacMillan – producer, recording 
 CJ Vanston – producer, additional recording, mixing, liner notes 
 Adrian Van Velsen – music mix preparation 
 Jay Asher – Logic Pro consultant 
 Gavin Lurssen – mastering 
 Ruben Cohen – mastering assistant
 Lurssen Mastering (Los Angeles, California) – mastering location 
 Nigel Dick – art direction, design 
 Ash Newell – photography 
 Anita Heilig – management 
 Mark Hartley – management

Charts

References

External links
 Album page on stevelukather.net
 

2010 albums
Steve Lukather albums